Ardonis malachitis is a moth in the family Geometridae. It is found on Seram and New Guinea.

Taxonomy
It is sometimes listed as a subspecies of Ardonis filicata.

References

Moths described in 1903
Eupitheciini
Moths of New Guinea